Raymond Edward Lemek (June 28, 1934 – September 17, 2005) was an American football guard and tackle in the National Football League for the Washington Redskins and Pittsburgh Steelers.  He played college football at the University of Notre Dame where he was the captain of the 1955 team. He was drafted by the Washington Redskins as an offensive lineman in the nineteenth round, 10th pick of the 1956 NFL Draft. He played for the Redskins 1956–1961, selected for the 1961 Pro Bowl and then played with the Pittsburgh Steelers 1962–1965. He was buried in the Cedar Grove Cemetery in Notre Dame, Indiana.

1934 births
2005 deaths
American football offensive guards
American football offensive tackles
Eastern Conference Pro Bowl players
Notre Dame Fighting Irish football players
Pittsburgh Steelers players
Washington Redskins players